Kuramey Vadhaaee Salaam is a 2006 Maldivian romantic family television series directed by Abdul Faththaah. The series stars Mohamed Manik, Mariyam Zuhura and Mariyam Afeefa in lead roles. The series marks Afeefa's first appearance in a television series.

Premise
After graduation, Fayaz (Mohamed Manik) the only son of a family helps his father, Saleem, in running his business. Ramiz (Ahmed Saeed), the son-in-law of the family, brainwashes Firasha (Khadheeja Ibrahim Didi), the younger sibling of Fayaz, accusing him as the ungrateful greedy man trying to captivate his father's wealth while leaving nothing for Firasha. Fayaz falls in love with Yumna (Mariyam Afeefa), an attractive young woman who temporarily moves into their house. Saleem disapproves their relationship and evicts the couple from his house, when Fayaz refuses to let Yumna go. Fayaz marries Yumna and they live a happy life with their kid until Yumna is met with an untimely death.

Cast

Main role
 Mohamed Manik as Ahmed Fayaz
 Mariyam Zuhura as Laila Adam
 Mariyam Afeefa as Aminath Yumna
 Ibrahim Jihad as Irufan
 Ahmed Saeed as Ramiz
 Khadheeja Ibrahim Didi as Firasha
 Mohamed Waheed as Mohamed Saleem
 Nahidha Mansoor as Azeeza
 Neena Saleem as Shamna; Laila's friend
 Fathimath Aflaz Faisal as Natha
 Aminath Shareef as Arifa; Laila's mother

Guest role
 Mohamed Afrah as Shamin (Episode 1)
 Chilhiya Moosa Manik as a magistrate (Episode 8)
 Hussain Nooradeen as a shop-keeper (Episode 11)

Soundtrack

References

External links 
 

Serial drama television series
Maldivian television shows